Sociedade Deportiva O Val is a football team based in Narón, A Coruña, in the autonomous community of Galicia. Founded in 1976, it currently plays in Preferente Autonómica Norte de Galicia. Their stadium is Sinde-O Val.

Season to season

2 seasons in Tercera División

External links
Futbolme.com profile

External links 
 Official Website

Football clubs in Galicia (Spain)
Divisiones Regionales de Fútbol clubs
Association football clubs established in 1976
1976 establishments in Spain